Bituin (International title: Star) is a 2002 musical Philippine soap opera that was aired by ABS-CBN from September 23, 2002 to May 23, 2003 replacing Pangako Sa 'Yo and was replaced by Basta't Kasama Kita. It starred Carol Banawa and Desiree del Valle with Nora Aunor and Cherie Gil.

The series was re-aired in 2007–2008 through Kapamilya Channel (now S+A International).

Bituin was famously known for the line that Nora Aunor belts out in a high caliber dramatic scene: "Nasaan Nasaan si Bernadette at Melody?" ("Where, where is Bernadette... and Melody?") The line was repeated in movies, TV series, and spoofed in gag shows, sitcoms, and comedy bars.

It was also known to have the highest-rated episode with The Diva vs Supernova concert. It was aired three days after the initial concert with more than a 48.7% audience share.

In 2007, TFC ABS-CBN international affiliate KPTV re-aired the whole series from September 2007 to February 2008.

The series also had a crossover with Kay Tagal Kang Hinintay in 2003 in various episodes. In early March 2012 - June 2012 the series had a 2-hour back to back episodes shown weekdays internationally through Cinema One Global part of its Drama On Demand hour of requested Classic TV Programs as request by television viewers commercial free and uncut.

The series also was noted to have singers Carol Banawa, Kuh Ledesma, and Jessa Zaragoza and Josh Santana in regular cast objectives the soap also centered on telenovela plot twists.

This series can be streaming on Jeepney TV YouTube Channel every night, 7:00 pm & 7:30 pm.

Plot
Laura Sandoval and Carmela Gaston are half sisters who grew up with Carmela's mom (Doña Virginia Gaston) not treating Laura right. When they grew older Carmela doesn't marry while Laura marries Badong. After their second child, she found out he had been cheating on her.

As a single mother she was struggling to support her two daughters Melody and Bernadette. When her eldest Melody becomes sick, Laura goes to Carmela asking for help, who says that she will help if she hands over Bernadette so she may raise her as her own. With no one left to turn to Laura does it.

Carmela left for the US to raise Bernadette and soon returns as a singer. In a concert, Laura knew their whereabouts. The kids grow up not knowing they are sisters. Melody notices that Laura is much closer to Bernadette, such as Laura teaching Bernadette to sing when she forbids Melody to do so. Bernadette becomes a star by recording Melody's voice and claiming it as her own. Both soon become singers. Melody finds her father and wins the heart of a young man named Dante.

In the end they all become a family: Badong and Laura find their love again, Carmela is no longer jealous of her sister, Doña Virginia gave the rightful will of her husband to Laura, Melody is a great singer and marries Josh Santana who is her singing partner, and Bernadette becomes a famous composer, especially the song she composed for her sister as a way to show she was sorry called "Sana Bukas"; she marries Dante, whom she fell in love with accidentally when she tried to help him win Melody's heart.

Cast and characters

Main cast
 Nora Aunor as Laura Sandoval
 Cherie Gil † as Carmela Gaston
 Carol Banawa as Melody Sandoval
 Kristel Fulgar as young Melody
 Desiree del Valle as Bernadette Gaston
 Eliza Pineda as young Bernadette
 Carlo Muñoz as Dante
 Michael Santana as Josh Santana
 Michael de Mesa as Salvador Sandoval
 Gardo Versoza as Diony
 Cherry Pie Picache as Olivia
 Celia Rodriguez as Doña Virginia Gaston
 Jessa Zaragoza as Sultanna Andromeda "Andromeda"-left the series during her pregnancy and taped her finale episodes
 Ronaldo Valdez as Amante Montesilverio
 Chat Silayan † as Elvira Montesilverio
 Tess Aquino as Madonna
 Frank Garcia as Alex Montesilverio
 Geoff Rodriguez as Dave Montesilverio
 Kuh Ledesma as Lyrica Luna

Supporting cast
 Efren Reyes Jr. as Arnel
 Ricardo Cepeda as Conrado
 Emilio Garcia as Ernesto
 Lui Villaruz as Boom
 John Apacible † as Willy
 Perla Bautista as Ofelia
 Rodel Velayo as Jimmy
 Camille Prats as Lovelyn Gaston
 Mat Ranillo III as Filemon Gaston
 Sylvia Sanchez as Eva
 Tado † as King
 John Lapus as Queenie
 Harlene Bautista as Tootsie
 Rochelle Barrameda as Leila
 Anita Linda † as Rustica
 Jestoni Alarcon as Bienvenido Galang
 Gigette Reyes as Dra. Reyes
 Julia Clarete as Agnes Gandoza
 Romnick Sarmenta as Pepito
 Camilla Villamil as Melai

Cameo appearances
 John Lloyd Cruz as Atty. Yuri Orbida (from the character of Kay Tagal Kang Hinintay)
 Bea Alonzo as Atty. Kathrina Argos (from the character of Kay Tagal Kang Hinintay)
 Kris Aquino
 Boy Abunda
 Ogie Diaz as Ogie
 Carlos Agassi
 Robert Seña
 John Lesaca
 Dessa
 Franco Laurel
 Divo Bayer
 Cooky Chua
 Agot Isidro
 Julius Babao
 Christine Bersola-Babao
 Edu Manzano
 Dindo de Viterbo
 Romi Sison
 Julio Diaz

Reception

Ratings
Its highest rating was 48.7% for the "Ultimate Showdown: The Diva VS The Supernova" of Melody and Bernadette at the Araneta Coliseum, while the lowest was 29.5%, its fifth episode.

In 2002, the series aired as the first lineup of Primetime Bida at 7:00 PM followed up by Sa Puso Ko Iingatan Ka (until February 14, 2003), Kay Tagal Kang Hinintay and Sa Dulo Ng Walang Hanggan (until February 28, 2003).

See also
List of programs broadcast by ABS-CBN
List of ABS-CBN drama series

References

External links
 

ABS-CBN drama series
2002 Philippine television series debuts
2003 Philippine television series endings
Philippine musical television series
Filipino-language television shows
Television shows set in the Philippines